The Upper Hiwassee Highlands AVA is an American Viticultural Area that includes land in three counties of northern Georgia and two counties of western North Carolina. It is located near the southern end of the Blue Ridge Mountains and includes portions of the Georgia counties of Fannin, Towns, and Union and of the North Carolina counties of Cherokee and Clay. The region is mainly in hardiness zone 7a.

References

Wineries
Nottely River Valley Vineyards

External links

American Viticultural Areas
2014 establishments in Georgia (U.S. state)
2014 establishments in North Carolina
Fannin County, Georgia
Towns County, Georgia
Union County, Georgia
Cherokee County, North Carolina
Clay County, North Carolina
Georgia (U.S. state) wine
North Carolina wine